The Birmingham Alabama Temple is the 98th operating temple of the Church of Jesus Christ of Latter-day Saints (LDS Church).

History
In 1998, when the LDS Church announced the intent to build a temple in Alabama two sites were originally considered. The first site revealed that the earth was too unstable for construction of the necessary size. Obstacles also prevented the project from being built on the second site. Finally in April 1999, the LDS Church selected a third site and decided that the temple would be built in the suburb of Gardendale where the church already owned property to build a meetinghouse.  The excess land proved an adequate size for one of the LDS Church's new smaller temples. From the groundbreaking to the dedication of the temple took only eleven months.

Gordon B. Hinckley dedicated the Birmingham Alabama Temple on September 3, 2000.

In 2020, the Birmingham Alabama Temple was closed in response to the coronavirus pandemic.

See also

 Comparison of temples of The Church of Jesus Christ of Latter-day Saints
 List of temples of The Church of Jesus Christ of Latter-day Saints
 List of temples of The Church of Jesus Christ of Latter-day Saints by geographic region
 Temple architecture (Latter-day Saints)
 The Church of Jesus Christ of Latter-day Saints in Alabama

Additional reading

References

External links
 
Birmingham Alabama Temple Official site
Birmingham Alabama Temple at ChurchofJesusChristTemples.org

20th-century Latter Day Saint temples
Religious buildings and structures in Birmingham, Alabama
Latter Day Saint movement in Alabama
Religious organizations based in Alabama
Temples (LDS Church) completed in 2000
Temples (LDS Church) in the United States
2000 establishments in Alabama